Khurda Road railway division is one of the three divisions of East Coast Railway Zone (ECoR) of the Indian Railways.

Main lines
The main lines of the division are as follows:

List of railway stations and towns 
The list includes the stations  under the Khurda Road railway division and their station category.

Stations closed for Passengers -

References

 

Rail transport in Odisha
Divisions of Indian Railways